Crematogaster curvispinosa is a species of ant in tribe Crematogastrini. It was described by Mayr in 1862.

References

curvispinosa
Insects described in 1862